Lisa Schroeder is an American chef, restaurateur, and owner of Mother's Bistro in Portland, Oregon. Previously, she opened and owned the Italian restaurant Mama Mia Trattoria.

During Portland's George Floyd protests, Schroeder commissioned artist Xochilt Ruvalcaba to paint murals on the boards on Mother's Bistro as part of the Black Lives Matter art in Portland, Oregon.

Bibliography

References

Living people
American women chefs
American women restaurateurs
American restaurateurs
Jewish women
Businesspeople from Portland, Oregon
Year of birth missing (living people)